Alec Cameron (3 March 1866 – 14 March 1957) was a Scotland international rugby union player.

Rugby Union career

Amateur career

Cameron played rugby union for Watsonians.

Provincial career

He played for Edinburgh District in their inter-city match against Glasgow District on 4 December 1886.

He played for East of Scotland District in their match against West of Scotland District on 19 January 1887.

International career

Cameron was capped 3 times by Scotland, from 1887 to 1894.

References

1866 births
1957 deaths
East of Scotland District players
Edinburgh District (rugby union) players
Rugby union players from Oban
Scotland international rugby union players
Scottish rugby union players
Watsonians RFC players
Rugby union fullbacks